The Canton of Ahun is a canton situated in the Creuse département and in the Nouvelle-Aquitaine region of central France.

Geography 
An area of farming and forestry in the arrondissement of Guéret, centred on the town of Ahun,.

Population

Composition 
At the French canton reorganisation which came into effect in March 2015, the canton was expanded from 11 to 27 communes:
 
Ahun
Ars
Banize
Chamberaud
La Chapelle-Saint-Martial
Chavanat
Le Donzeil
Fransèches
Janaillat
Lépinas
Maisonnisses
Mazeirat
Moutier-d'Ahun
Peyrabout
Pontarion
La Pouge
Saint-Avit-le-Pauvre
Saint-Georges-la-Pouge
Saint-Hilaire-la-Plaine
Saint-Hilaire-le-Château
Saint-Martial-le-Mont
Saint-Michel-de-Veisse
Saint-Yrieix-les-Bois 
Sardent
Sous-Parsat
Thauron
Vidaillat

See also 
 Arrondissements of the Creuse department
 Cantons of the Creuse department
 Communes of the Creuse department

References

Ahun